Al-Hejaz Club is a Saudi Arabian football team in Baljurashi City playing at the Saudi Third Division.

Current squad 
As of Saudi Third Division:

References

External links
 Al Hejaz Club at Kooora.com

Hejaz
Hejaz
Hejaz
Hejaz